Poobong Tea Garden (also spelled Pubong) is a village in the Jorebunglow Sukhiapokhri CD block in the Darjeeling Sadar subdivision of the Darjeeling district in West Bengal, India.

Etymology
Poobong means 'a valley behind the clouds'.

History
Poobong Tea Estate was established in 1913.

Geography

Area overview
The map alongside shows a portion of the southern portion of the Darjeeling Himalayan hill region in the Darjeeling district. In the Darjeeling Sadar subdivision 61.00% of the total population lives in the rural areas and 39.00% of the population lives in the urban areas. In the Mirik subdivision 80.11% of the total population lives in rural areas and 19.89% lives in urban areas. There are 78 tea gardens/ estates (the figure varies slightly according to different sources), in the district, producing and largely exporting Darjeeling tea. It engages a large proportion of the population directly/ indirectly. Some tea gardens were identified in the 2011 census as census towns or villages. Such places are marked in the map as CT (census town) or R (rural/ urban centre). Specific tea estate pages are marked TE.

Note: The map alongside presents some of the notable locations in the subdivision. All places marked in the map are linked in the larger full screen map.

Location

Poobong, situated between Sukhiapokhri and Ghoom, is so small that it is often referred to as 'Chhota Poobong'. It is 8 km from Ghoom railway station and 13 km from Darjeeling.

From the main road it is around 3.5 km rough road down towards the village. The main sources of income of this place was/is working in the Tea Garden but some are engaged in agriculture and some go to work in different parts of India and abroad.

Poobong has two divisions: Tea estate and Busty. There are 4 primary schools, Chettri Goan Primary School, Poobong Kaman Primary School, Alubari Primary School and Poobong Fatak Primary School; one junior high school is in school Dara. For higher education one has to go to Ghoom, Sukhia, Darjeeling etc.

Demographics
According to the 2011 Census of India, Pubong Tea Garden had a total population of 2,170 of which 1,098 (51%) were males and 1,072 (49%) were females. There were 165 persons in the age range of 0 to 6 years. The total number of literate people in Pubong Tea Garden was 1,660 (76.50% of the population over 6 years).

Gallery

References

External links

Villages in Darjeeling district
Tourist attractions in Darjeeling district